Jesús Mari Lazkano (born 1960, in Bergara) is a Spanish Basque painter. He graduated in fine arts from the University of the Basque Country, where he is Professor of Fine Arts, and has had exhibitions in Europe, America and Asia. Some of his work is part of the Bilbao Guggenheim Museum collection.

Along with Jose Venero, he made the movie Artiko, which was selected to appear at the In The Palace International Short Film Festival in Varna, Bulgaria, and the Ulju Mountain Film Festival, South Korea.

One-man shows
2018	ARCTIC, short movie, Signo Digital Productions.
2017	The Arctic Circle, Scientific-artistic expedition to the Arctic,  Svalbard; Bilbao Art Fair Lumbreras Gallery
2016	Two worlds. Site Specific, Smithsonian Folklife Festival, Washington; Ikusmira. Retrospective Exhibition. Kursaal  San Sebastian; Natura, Aoiz Art Center, Navarra; Bilbao Art Fair, Windsor Gallery
2014   Chair-man Gallery Beijing, China; Natura Imaginis, Altxerri Gallery, San Sebastian
2012	798 Art Bridge Gallery Beijing China
2010   From architecture to nature Museo de Bellas Artes de Bilbao
2008   From the memory Museo Euskal Herria, Gernika
2007   Laboratory, Guggenheim  Museum Bilbao Galleria Il Polittico, Roma
2006   Windsor Kulturgintza, Bilbao
2005   Galería Antonio Machon, Madrid.
2004   Galleria Il Polittico, Roma
2003   Retrospective 1989-2003, Fundación BBK, Bilbao; Galería SEI, Pamplona.
2002   Galería Antonio Machón, Madrid.
2001   Galleria Il Polittico, Roma.
2000   Galería Antonio de Barnola, Barcelona.
1999   The Times, Sala Rekalde, Bilbao Galería Antonio Machón. Madrid.
1998 	 From the beauty to the useful, International industrial architecture seminary Palacio Montehermoso. Vitoria.
1997 	Sala Artxibo Foral, Retrospective 1984 -1989, BilbaoLe 29º Festival; International de la Pinture, Cagnes-sur-Mer, Francia; Galería Dieciseis, San Sebastián.
1996   Adams Middleton Gallery, Dallas, USA; Windsor Kulturgintza, Bilbao.
1995  	Embassy  Gallery, Yakarta, Indonesia. Galería Antonio Machón, Madrid.
1993  	Galería Antonio Machón, Madrid.ARCO"93, ART FAIR Galería Antonio Machón, Madrid.
1992   Adams-Midleton Gallery, Dallas, USACollection DOBE, Monte Bre, Lugano, Suiza.
1991  	CHICAGO ART FAIR, Galería Michel Chenau, Collection DOBE, Chicago.
1990   Mural for the  underground of Bilbao, 600m. squaresGalería Antonio Machón, Madrid; Windsor Kulturgintza, Bilbao.
1989  	Galería Antonio Machón, Madrid.
1988  	Galería Dieciseis, San Sebastián. Sala BBK, Bilbao.
1987  	Galería Gamarra Garrigues, Madrid.
1986  	Herrikasarte, Munguía.
1985  	Sala Ezkurdi, Durango. Galería Dieciseis, San Sebastián.
1984  	Sala Gran Vía, 21, Bilbao.
1983 	ARTEDER-83, Bilbao; Windsor Kulturgintza, Bilbao; Sala Kutxa, San Sebastián, Azpeitia

Public paintings

2011	Natura Imaginis, 6 x 15 metres. IBERDROLA Tower, Cesar Pelli architect, Bilbao.

2010	BILBO MMX, 125 x 720 cm. Stand Bilbao, EXPO SHANGAI 2010

2009  Project for the Matadero Bridge, Madrid, with the Adrian Geuze's
Studio West 8 Urban Design &Landscape Architecture de Rotterdam

2007   Leioatik-Leioara. 125 x 650 cm Kultur Etxea, Leioa
Hemendik nora eta nola, Two pieces of 200 x 2.000 cm. Aula Magna of University of the Basque Country, Bilbao.

2006   Water tank of Gernika, 500 x 8.400 cm, Water consortium of Busturialdea, Gernika “Busturialdea”, Gernika.

2005   Paisaje de paso, 4 pieces  of 800 x 200 cm. Intermodal of San Mames, Renfe Bilbao; Bizkaia, 3 x 5 meters. Bilbao Exhibition Center, Barakaldo.

2002   From the relative or the place of the memory 3,5 x 12 meters. Palacio de Música y Congresos  Euskalduna, Bilbao; Arriaga´s dream, 3 x 5 meters. Tram of Bilbao Euskotran,. Temporal installation.

2001   Euskadi, 244 x 530 cm. Basque Parliament, Vitoria-Gazteiz

1996   Roof mural of the Argentaria's foundation library, Madrid.

1991    Realization of 4 stamps for the post: Spanish Bank, Alvaro de Bazán, Fuente de Apolo, and San Isidro institute, due to Madrid being European culture capital. “Ed. Casa de la Moneda y Timbre”, Madrid.

1990   Hemendik nora, 10 x 60 meters, Mural for the Bilbao underground. Demolished

Public collections and museums

Guggenheim Museum. Bilbao.
Château du Montbeliard Museum, France.
Bvlgary Collection, Hong Kong, Los Angeles.
Collection DOBE, Lugano, Suiza.
Financial Corporation Washington.
Spanish academy of Fine Arts, Roma.
Fine Arts Museum of Bilbao.
Artium Museum, Vitoria.
Col. Goldman Saatchi, Madrid.
Col. Testimoni. La Caixa, Barcelona. 
Col. BBVA. Madrid.
San Telmo Museum, San Sebastian.
Basque Government, Vitoria.
Youth Institute, Madrid.
Col. Caja Postal. Madrid.
Col. Bilbao Undergrown.
Patio Herreriano Museum, Valladolid.
Col. Ajuriaenea palace, Vitoria.
Col. Argentaria Foundation, Madrid.
Col. Athletic Club de Bilbao.
Casa de la Moneda y Timbre, Madrid.
Museo Municipal Madrid. 
BSCH Foundation. Santander.
Basque Parliament, Vitoria.
Opera House, Bilbao. 
Bilbao Exhibition Center.
Euskaltel, Derio.

Prizes and grants

2007  “Titanio” prize. Basque and Navarre architecture's college  “Ria del ocio” Prize
2001  First “Vacamanía” Prize, Bilbao
1997  Spanish Academy of Roma  scholarship
1995  Scholarship from the Spanish embassy of Indonesia
1991  Premio Ibérico Dos Mil. “Ibérico Dos Mil” Prize
1990  Artistic creation  “Banesto”  Grant
1988  Basque Government Grant
1987  II Prize of engravings “Gure Artea”
1986  “Caja de Ahorros Vizcaina” GrantYoung art Prize, Culture Department, Madrid. 
1985   First Prize “Gure Artea” “Adquisición Bizkaiko Artea” Prize
1984  Basque Government Grant First “Bienal of Basque Art” Prize, Amorebieta.
1983  Artistic creation Grant, Delegation of Gipuzkoa
1982  First prize for the Young Artists, San Sebastian

Courses and conferences

Teacher of the Master in Research on the territory and the landscape, University of Elche, Spain
Teacher of the Master in Research and creation of art, University of the Basque Country
Urban iconographies. In architecture and society, Oficial Collage of Architecture Basque and Navarre, Bilbao, July 2007
From the process, Practice course, Guggenheim Museum, Bilbao, 2007
Ruins of the contemporary painting, University of Kiel, Germany, 2006
My painting and the city. Literature and the city. Theory and practice application; XXV Summer courses – XVIII European Courses of the UPV San Sebastian, 2006
Organization of a cycle of conferences  Landscapes, which landscapes? Bilboarte centre. Bilbao, April–May 2002
Art and nature. The garden like an art. From 15−19 September, Department of the History Art, Philosophy and Literature Faculty of Zaragoza. Huesca, 1997
Doctoral courses  Creación e investigación en Arte. Pintura. 1994-2010
11/4 International industrial architecture's seminary. From 7−27 September. Area of urban renewal of Vitoria, Department of urbanism of the delegation of Araba and department of order of the Basque Government territory
Doctoral courses Research and creation of art. Painting. 1994−2010

Lectures
About the creative process. Architecture School Tongji University. Shanghai. 2011
From the architecture to the nature. Fine Arts Museum, Bilbao. 2011
Landscape, city, painting, Fine Arts Faculty, University of Warsaw, Poland, 2010
Landscape, city, painting, University of Art and Design, Helsinki, 2008
“Art between us” Inaugural lecture for the official opening ceremony of the course 2007-8. University of the Basque Country, 2007
“Progetto pittorico”, Fine Arts academy of Venice, 2007
Architectonic report, “Titanio prize”, Architecture Basque and Navarre Collage, Bilbao, 2007
Ideal topographies, Guggenheim Museum, Bilbao, 2007
Readings in Arquiesculture, Guggenheim Museum Bilbao, December 2005
“Switching on words in a paper”, Oteiza other. Guggenheim Museum Bilbao, December 2004
Landscape and painting. Philosophy Faculty. University of Deusto. Bilbao. 2002
The garden like the laboratory or a natural geometry. Postgrade courses of Art and Nature, the garden like an art. Huesca, Spain, 1997
From the way of expression of a province painter, Argentaria Foundation, Bilbao. February, 1996
From how to reduce the distances or the painting like an antidote.  Real Sociedad Bascongada de Amigos del País Delegación en Corte, Madrid. November, 1994

Books and catalogues of one-man shows
Landscape soul, Ed. 798 Bridge Gallery Beijing China
From  architecture to nature  Ed. Museo de Bellas Artes de Bilbao
Lazkano Cuaderno de Notas Ed. Museo de Bellas Artes de Bilbao 
“Desde la Pintura” en  RIEV JOURNAL, Eusko Ikaskuntza, 51-52, pag 241-334, Bilbao, 2007
Natura dello of Lorenzo Canova, Ed. Il Político, Roma, 2007. spazio, introduction
Roma-New York, introducción Arnaldo Romani Brizzi, Ed. Il Polittico, Roma, 2004
Catálogo Razonado LAZKANO 1989-2002. Kosme de Barañano. Ed BBK, Bilbao, 2003
ROMA, facsímil  Italian notebook drawings . Ed. Bassarai, Vitoria, 2003.
El espejo transparente, introduction, author's texts. Ed. Antonio Machón, Madrid. 2002.
Roma Veduta, introduction Edward Lucie-Smith, Ed. Il Político, Roma, 2001.
De las Formas Simples, introduction  Juan Manuel Bonet and text of Jesús Mari Lazkano. Ed. Antonio de Barnola. Barcelona. 2000.
De los tiempos, essay of Fernando Castro, Ed. Rekalde, June, July, August, 1999, Bilbao
Ars Fragmentaria, introduction Kosme de Barañano and text  Jesús Mari Lazkano. Ed. Galería Antonio Machón, Madrid, 1999.
De lo bello y lo útil o recorrido pictórico por algunas ruinas de la industria vizcaína y otros pueblos. Jesús Mari Lazkano 1984-1989. introduction Javier González de Durana, September−October 1997. Ed. Diputación Foral de Bizkaia, Bilbao, 1997.
De la memoria, author's texts, Ed. Windsor Kulturgintza, Bilbao, 1997.
Del Orden Natural, author's texts, October–November, 1995. Ed. Galería Antonio Machón, Madrid, 1996.
La Gran Utopía, introducción del author, January–February, 1993. Ed. Galería Antonio Machón. Madrid, 1996.
Cuaderno de Notas, facsímil New York drawings,  introduction Antonio Bonet. Ed. Haizegoa, Bilbao, 1992.
Jesús Mari Lazkano, (separata), Catálogo Nacional de Arte Contemporáneo 1991-1992 IBERICOÊ2 MIL, introduction Miguel Zugaza, Barcelona, 1992.
Viena-Nueva York, author's texts. Ed. Galería Windsor Kulturgintza, Bilbao, May,1990.
Jesús Mari Lazkano, introduction Jon Juaristi. Ed. Galería Antonio Machón, Madrid, April–May, 1989.
Catálogo razonado, 1977-1988, (separata), Kobie N1/4 5, serie Bellas Artes, introduction Javier González de Durana. Ed. Diputación Foral de Bizkaia, Bilbao, 1988.
Jesús Mari Lazkano. PAINTINGS, introduction Javier González de Durana. Ed. Caja de Ahorros Vizcaína, Bilbao, 1988.
Lazkano. Ed. Galería Gamarra - Garrigues, Madrid, May, 1987.
Jesús Mari Lazkano. Margoak - Pinturas, introduction Txema Exparta. Ed. Caja de Ahorros Vizcaína, Bilbao, May, 1984.
Bueno..., Ed. Jesús Mari Lazkano y Joseba Macías, Bilbao, 1982.

References

 Official page

1960 births
Living people
Basque painters
20th-century Spanish painters
20th-century Spanish male artists
Spanish male painters
21st-century Spanish painters
University of the Basque Country alumni
21st-century Spanish male artists